This is a list of professional wrestlers and other people who appeared in the original incarnation of Extreme Championship Wrestling

Wrestlers who used more than one ringname while in ECW will be listed under the ring name for which they used the most or were best known in order to clean up the list, since any performer who used multiple ring names most likely has them listed on their personal article page with their current or most used ring name in bold on said page.  Their other ring names will be listed after their name next to their years worked.

Stables and tag teams will be listed alphabetically in their own separate section at the bottom of the list.

Alumni

Male wrestlers

Female wrestlers

Managers, valets, and entourage members

Commentators and interviewers

Referees

Other personnel

Notes

References

External links
 Cagematch – The Internet Wrestling Database
 Hardcore Memories – Extreme Nostalgia

Alumni
Extreme Championship Wrestling alumni